José Maurício (Coimbra, 19 March 1752 - Figueira da Foz, 12 September 1815) was a Portuguese composer mainly known for his prolific production of sacred music.

A native of Coimbra, Mauricio began as singer and organist and rose to become both chapel master at Coimbra Cathedral, and music professor at the Universidade de Coimbra during the reforms of João VI.

Works
Requiem
Miserere

Like many other church composers of his time he also composed secular songs, modinhas.

References

1752 births
1815 deaths
Portuguese Classical-period composers
People from Coimbra
Portuguese classical composers
Portuguese male classical composers
19th-century Portuguese musicians
18th-century Portuguese musicians
19th-century male musicians

Marcello Piras - "Musica nera e teatro" (youtube parte 1-5), italian